Nartanasala (stylized as @Nartanasala) is a 2018 Indian Telugu-language romantic comedy film written and directed by debutant Srinivas Chakravarthi. The film was produced by Usha Mulpuri on Ira Creations banner which featured Naga Shourya and newcomer Kashmira Pardeshi and Yamini Bhaskar in the lead.

Mahati Swara Sagar composed the soundtrack and the background score for the film while Vijay C Kumar provided the cinematography and Kotagiri Venkateswara Rao did the editing for the film.

Plot 

Radha Krishna (Naga Shaurya), who runs a self-defense class for women, falls in love with a woman named Manasa (Kashmira Pardeshi). Meanwhile, his marriage gets fixed with her cousin Satya. Soon he comes up with a lie that he's gay to escape the situation. Soon after his marriage gets fixed to Satya's brother. What happens next forms the rest of the story.

Cast 
 Naga Shourya as Radha Krishna
 Kashmira Pardeshi as Manasa
 Yamini Bhaskar as Satya
 Shivaji Raja as Radha's father
 Ajay as Satya's brother
 Jaya Prakash Reddy as Satya's father
 Sudha as Satya's mother
 Priya as Radha's Mother
 Satyam Rajesh as an accident victim
 Gundu Sudarshan as priest Krishna

Soundtrack
Music composed by Mahati Swara Sagar. Music released on Aditya Music Company.

Reception
A critic from The Times of India wrote that "@Nartanasala isn't worth your time".

References

External links
 

Indian romantic comedy films
2018 directorial debut films
Films shot in Hyderabad, India
2010s Telugu-language films
2018 romantic comedy films